Enriqueta Mayora (15 February 1921 – 9 November 1989) was a Mexican fencer. She competed in the women's individual foil event at the 1948 Summer Olympics.

References

External links
 

1921 births
1989 deaths
Mexican female foil fencers
Olympic fencers of Mexico
Fencers at the 1948 Summer Olympics
Fencers from Mexico City